The Charles Gates Dawes House is a historic house museum at 225 Greenwood Street in Evanston, Illinois.  Built in 1894, this Chateauesque lakefront mansion was from 1909 until his death the home of Charles Gates Dawes (1865–1951) and his family.  Dawes earned the 1925 Nobel Peace Prize for his plan to alleviate the crushing burden of war reparations Germany was required to pay after World War I.  Dawes served as U.S. Vice President under Calvin Coolidge, a general during World War I, and as United States Ambassador to Great Britain.  Dawes was a descendant of William Dawes, who along with Paul Revere, rode to alarm the colonists that the British regulars were coming on the night before the Revolutionary War began. The house, a National Historic Landmark, is now owned by the Evanston History Center (formerly known as the Evanston Historical Society), which offers tours.

History 
Charles G. Dawes and family lived here from 1909 to 1951. He donated the house to Northwestern University in 1944 with the understanding that it be used as the home of the Evanston Historical Society, now known as the Evanston History Center. The Dawes family continued to occupy it until Mrs. Caro Blymer Dawes' death in 1957, and it became home to the Historical Society in 1960. In 2009, Northwestern University donated the house to the Evanston History Center.

Architect
The house was built in 1894 for Robert Sheppard, treasurer and business manager of Northwestern University, and designed by H. Edwards Ficken (1844–1929) of New York.

Ficken was born in London and educated in Europe.  He came to the United States in 1869 and began his career as an architectural renderer, and was the partner of Boston architect Charles D. Gambrill at the time of the latter's suicide in September 1880.
Gambrill had been a partner of Henry Hobson Richardson from 1867 to 1878.

Ficken's career included several distinguished commissions, including ones for the New York Athletic Club and Yale University and, for the last thirteen years of his life he was the supervising architect and engineer for Woodlawn Cemetery on Long Island.

The architecture

The house is considered to be an example of the Chateauesque style of architecture, but in many respects it is not typical.

The style was introduced to the United States in 1882 by Richard Morris Hunt, the first American architect to attend the École des Beaux-Arts in Paris, when he built a palace in the style at 660 Fifth Avenue in New York for Alva and William Kissam Vanderbilt (demolished, 1926). Architects of the time who attempted to create pure examples of the style emulated the features of the 16th Century chateaux of the Loire Valley in France, usually sheathing the buildings with limestone and decorating them with elaborate Renaissance carving.  Perhaps the best example of this style remaining in Chicago is the house at 1801 S. Prairie Ave. (see picture) that was designed in 1890 by Solon Spencer Beman and built for the piano manufacturer William W. Kimball at a reputed cost of one million dollars. The house, which the noted author and essayist Thomas Schlereth from The University of Notre Dame called "a brilliant exercise in the chateau style", was designed using exterior features from the 16th Century remodeling of the Chateau de Josselin in Brittany. Certainly the best example ever built in the United States is the 225-room Biltmore House (1888–1895), the home of George Washington Vanderbilt II constructed in Asheville, NC, which was also designed by Hunt.

The detailing of the Dawes house represents more the flavor of rural French architecture, and in this respect has more in common with the rustic character of Grey Towers, the much larger home of Gifford Pinchot outside of Milford, Pennsylvania that was designed largely by Hunt in 1886, but in which Ficken had a hand in some of the details. Even a quick study of the Dawes house, Grey Towers, and the more formally detailed John A. McGill house (1892) in Chicago (see picture) will show how closely they are all related to each other and to their French antecedents, especially to the Château de Chambord at Chambord, Loir-et-Cher in France.

Richard Morris Hunt became the leading proponent of French-inspired architecture after his return to the United States from his studies in Europe in 1855.  In 1873 he received both his first urban commission and his first commission in the city of Chicago when he built a house in the related Second Empire style for the iconic Chicago retailer Marshall Field at 1905 S. Prairie Ave that was considered to be the "first really artistic dwelling house" in Chicago, and although the country's enthusiasm for French-styled buildings that he was largely responsible for creating waned in the early years of the 20th century, interest in it remains with us to this day.

Gallery

Landmark status
The house was declared a National Historic Landmark in 1976.

Evanston History Center
The Evanston History Center (EHC), formerly the Evanston Historical Society, maintains its headquarters at the Charles Gates Dawes House.  The house is open to the public by docent-led tours, featuring a walk through the library, dining room, kitchen, and great hall which are decorated with period furnishings and artwork once belonging to the Dawes family. The EHC also runs public events, workshops, lectures, and a research room containing documents, books, photographs, maps and other historical archival material related to Evanston history.www.evanstonhistorycenter.org

See also
List of National Historic Landmarks in Illinois
National Register of Historic Places listings in Cook County, Illinois

References

External links

Evanston History Center

Historic house museums in Illinois
Houses completed in 1894
Houses on the National Register of Historic Places in Cook County, Illinois
Museums in Evanston, Illinois
National Historic Landmarks in Illinois